One Voice is Micah's 5th album.

Track listing

Chart performance
One Voice peaked at #5 on the Billboard Top Gospel Albums chart. In the same year, the album also peaked at #37 on the Top Independent Albums

2011 albums